The Shanghai–Xi'an Expressway, designated as G40 and commonly referred to as the Hushaan Expressway is an expressway that connects the cities of Shanghai and Xi'an, Shaanxi.

The expressway was completed after Chongqi Bridge opened to commercial traffic on December 24, 2011.

The expressway uses the Shanghai Yangtze River Tunnel and Bridge and the Chongqi Bridge, to cross the Yangtze River north of Shanghai.

The expressway passes through the following cities:
 Shanghai
 Nantong, Jiangsu
 Yangzhou, Jiangsu
 Nanjing, Jiangsu
 Hefei, Anhui
 Lu'an, Anhui
 Xinyang, Henan
 Nanyang, Henan
 Shangzhou District, Shangluo, Shaanxi
 Xi'an, Shaanxi

References

Chinese national-level expressways
Expressways in Shanghai
Expressways in Jiangsu
Expressways in Anhui
Expressways in Henan
Expressways in Shaanxi